MusterMesse  is a theatre festival in Berlin, Germany.

Theatre festivals in Berlin